Cape Greco, also known as Capo Greco (Italian for "Greek cape"), is a headland in the southeastern part of the island of Cyprus. It is at the southern end of Famagusta Bay and forms part of Ayia Napa Municipality. It lies between the towns of Ayia Napa and Protaras, both tourist resorts, and is visited by tourists for its natural environment. It is the  easternmost point of both the Republic of Cyprus and the European Union.  According to local legend, it is also the home of the 'Ayia Napa sea monster'.

Important Bird Area
A 1209 the area encompassing the cape has been designated an Important Bird Area (IBA) by BirdLife International because it is a key migration site for large numbers of raptors and other birds. It forms a migratory bottleneck for red-footed falcons, pallid harriers, honey buzzards and common kestrels, as well as supporting breeding populations of Cyprus wheatears, Cyprus warblers and black francolins. Although the cape is a National Forest Park under the administration of the Forestry Department of the Cyprus Ministry of the Interior, the birds there are threatened by illegal trapping.

Transmitter

Cape Greco was the location of a powerful mediumwave broadcasting station operated by Radio Monte Carlo; it carried the French- and Arabic-language programme of Radio Monte Carlo Middle East / RMC Moyen-Orient aimed at audiences in the Middle East and Northern Africa. In the early morning hours and for some years at late night, it carried programmes of TWR in Arabic, Armenian and Persian.

The transmitter site was constructed in the early 1970s and started operation 1973 carrying the French- and Arabic-language programme of Radio Radio Monte Carlo Middle East / RMC Moyen-Orient on a frequency of 1233 kHz with 600 kW. After 1974, early morning and late night hours were used to transmit programmes of Trans World Radio targeted at the Middle East. For financial reasons and declining importance of mediumwave, the RMC Moyen-Orient transmissions were terminated on 31 December 2019.

The interest of the U.S. in a broadcasting facility to cover the Middle East led to a contract to use the reserve antenna and a second transmitter was installed in 1992. From 2002, this transmitter carried the Arabic-language programme of Radio Sawa founded by the U.S. government. From the initial frequency of 981 kHz it had to move to 990 kHz because of interference with ERT broadcasting from Athens, the transmissions with 600 kW ceased on 1 July 2019.

In early November 2021, both antennas were demolished and a nature reserve information centre was to take the place of the transmitter buildings.

See also
Geography of Cyprus

References

External links

751 Signals Unit Cape Greco 

Greco
Protected areas of Cyprus
Important Bird Areas of Cyprus
Raptor migration sites